The Bactrian camel (Camelus bactrianus), also known as the Mongolian camel or domestic Bactrian camel, is a large even-toed ungulate native to the steppes of Central Asia. It has two humps on its back, in contrast to the single-humped dromedary. Its population of 2 million exists mainly in the domesticated form. Their name comes from the ancient historical region of Bactria.

Domesticated Bactrian camels have served as pack animals in inner Asia since ancient times. With its tolerance for cold, drought, and high altitudes, it enabled the travel of caravans on the Silk Road. Bactrian camels, whether domesticated or feral, are a separate species from the wild Bactrian camel, which is the only truly wild (as opposed to feral) species of camelid in the Old World.

Taxonomy 

The Bactrian camel shares the genus Camelus with the dromedary (C. dromedarius) and the wild Bactrian camel (C. ferus). The Bactrian camel belongs to the family Camelidae. The ancient Greek philosopher Aristotle was the first European to describe the camels: In his 4th century BCE History of Animals he identified the one-humped Arabian camel and the two-humped Bactrian camel. The Bactrian camel was given its current binomial name Camelus bactrianus by Swedish zoologist Carl Linnaeus in his 1758 publication Systema Naturae.

In 2007, Peng Cui (of the Chinese Academy of Sciences) and colleagues carried out a phylogenetic study of the evolutionary relationships between the two tribes of Camelidae: Camelini – consisting of the three Camelus species (the study considered the wild Bactrian camel as a subspecies of the Bactrian camel) – and Lamini – consisting of the alpaca (Vicugna pacos), the guanaco (Lama guanicoe), the llama (L. glama) and the vicuña (V. vicugna). The study revealed that the two tribes had diverged 25 million years ago (early Miocene), notably earlier than what had been previously estimated from North American fossils. Speciation began first in Lamini as the alpaca came into existence 10 million years ago. Nearly 2 million years later, the Bactrian camel and the dromedary emerged as two independent species. However, the fossil record suggests a far more recent divergence between the Bactrian camel and the dromedary because despite a moderately rich fossil record of camelids, no fossil that fits within this divergence is older than middle Pleistocene (about 0.8 Ma).

The Bactrian camel and the dromedary often interbreed to produce fertile offspring. Where the ranges of the two species overlap, such as in northern Punjab, Iran and Afghanistan, the phenotypic differences between them tend to decrease as a result of extensive crossbreeding between them. The fertility of their hybrid has given rise to speculation that the Bactrian camel and the dromedary should be merged into a single species with two varieties. However, a 1994 analysis of the mitochondrial cytochrome b gene revealed that the species display 10.3% divergence in their sequences.

Differences from wild Bactrian camels 
The wild Bactrian camel (Camelus ferus) was first described by Nikolay Przhevalsky in the late 19th century and has now been established as a distinct species from the Bactrian camel (Camelus bactrianus).
Zoological opinion nowadays tends to favour the idea that C. bactrianus and C. dromedarius are descendants of two different subspecies of C. ferus (Peters and von den Driesch 1997: p. 652) and there is no evidence to suggest that the original range of C. ferus included those parts of Central Asia and Iran where some of the earliest Bactrian remains have been found. In particular, a population of wild Bactrian camel has been discovered to live within a part of the Gashun Gobi region of the Gobi Desert. This population is distinct from domesticated herds both in genetic makeup and in behavior.

As many as three regions in the genetic makeup are distinctly different from Bactrian camels, with up to a 3% difference in the base genetic code. However, with so few wild camels, what the natural genetic diversity within a population would have been is not clear.

Another difference is the ability of these wild camels to drink saltwater slush, although whether the camel can extract useful water from it is not yet certain. Domesticated camels are unable to drink such salty water.

Description 

The Bactrian camel is the largest mammal in its native range and is the largest living camel while being shorter at the shoulder than the dromedary.

Its long, wooly coat varies in colour from dark brown to sandy beige.

The shaggy winter coat is shed extremely rapidly, with huge sections peeling off at once, appearing as if sloppily shorn. The two humps on the back are composed of fat (not water as is sometimes thought). The face is typical of a camelid, being long and somewhat triangular, with a split upper lip. The long eyelashes, along with the sealable nostrils, help to keep out dust in the frequent sandstorms which occur in their natural range. The two broad toes on each foot have undivided soles and are able to spread widely as an adaptation to walking on sand. The feet are very tough, as befits an animal of extreme environments.

Natural habitat 
These camels are migratory, and their habitat ranges from rocky mountain massifs to flat arid desert, stony plains, and sand dunes. Conditions are extremely harsh – vegetation is sparse, water sources are limited and temperatures are extreme. The camels' distribution is linked to the availability of water, with large groups congregating near rivers after rain or at the foot of the mountains, where water can be obtained from springs in the summer months, and in the form of snow during the winter.

Life history 

Bactrian camels are exceptionally adept at withstanding wide variations in temperature, ranging from freezing cold to blistering heat. They have a remarkable ability to go without water for months at a time, but when water is available they may drink up to 57 liters at once. When well fed, the humps are plump and erect, but as resources decline, the humps shrink and lean to the side. When moving faster than a walking speed, they pace, by stepping forwards with both legs on the same side (as opposed to trotting, using alternate diagonals as done by most other quadrupeds). Speeds of up to  have been recorded, but they rarely move this fast. Bactrian camels are also said to be good swimmers. The sense of sight is well developed and the sense of smell is extremely good. The lifespan of Bactrian camels is estimated at up to 50 years, more often 20 to 40 in captivity.

Diet 

Bactrian camels are diurnal, sleeping in the open at night and foraging for food during the day. They are primarily herbivorous. With tough mouths that can withstand sharp objects such as thorns, they are able to eat plants that are dry, prickly, salty or bitter, and can ingest virtually any kind of vegetation. When other nutrient sources are not available, these camels may feed on carcasses, gnawing on bones, skin, or various different kinds of flesh. In more extreme conditions, they may eat any material they find, which has included rope, sandals, and even tents. Their ability to feed on a wide range of foods allows them to live in areas with sparse vegetation. The first time food is swallowed, it is not fully chewed. The partly masticated food (called cud) goes into the stomach and later is brought back up for further chewing.

Bactrian camels belong to a fairly small group of animals that regularly eat snow to provide their water needs. Animals living above the snowline may have to do this, as snow and ice can be the only forms of water during winter, and by doing so, their range is greatly enlarged. The latent heat of snow and ice is big compared with the heat capacity of water, forcing animals to eat only small amounts at a time.

Reproduction 

Bactrian camels are induced ovulators – they ovulate after insemination (insertion of semen into the vagina); the seminal plasma, not the spermatozoa, induces ovulation. Ovulation occurs in 87% of females after insemination: 66% ovulate within 36 hours and the rest by 48 hours (the same as natural mating). The least amount of semen required to elicit ovulation is about 1.0 ml.

Males during mating time are often quite violent and may bite, spit, or attempt to sit on other male camels. The age of sexual maturity varies, but is usually reached at 3–5 years. Gestation lasts around 13 months. One or occasionally two calves are produced, and the female can give birth to a new calf every other year. They are nursed for about 1.5 years. The young calf stays with its mother for three to five years, until it reaches sexual maturity, and often helps raise subsequent generations for those years. Wild camels sometimes breed with domesticated or feral camels.

Genome
The  provides a C. bactrianus ferus genome using next generation sequencing.

Several effective population size studies have been carried out. They show several bottlenecks in both wild and domesticated Bactrians over the past 350,000 years.

Relationship to humans 

The Bactrian camel was domesticated circa ~4,500 BCE. The dromedary is believed to have been domesticated between 4000 BCE and 2000 BCE in Arabia. The species was a mainstay of transportation on the Silk Road. Furthermore, Bactrian camels are frequently ridden, especially in desertified areas. In ancient Sindh, for example, Bactrian camels of two humps were initially used by the rich for riding. The camel was later brought to other areas such as Balochistan and Iran for the same purpose.

Bactrian camels have been the focus of artwork throughout history. For example, westerners from the Tarim Basin and elsewhere were depicted in numerous ceramic figurines of the Chinese Tang dynasty (618–907).

United States imports 
Bactrian camels were imported to the U.S. several times in the mid- to late 1800s, both by the U.S. military and by merchants and miners, looking for pack animals sturdier and hardier than horses and mules. Although the camels met these needs, the United States Camel Corps was never considered much of a success. Having brought two shipments of fewer than 100 camels to the U.S., plans were made to import another 1,000, but the US Civil War interrupted this. Most surviving camels of these endeavors, both military and private, were merely turned loose to survive in the wild. As a result, small feral herds of Bactrian camels existed during the late 19th century in the southwest deserts of the United States.

Documentaries 
 The Story of the Weeping Camel is a 2003 Mongolian documentary/story about a family of nomadic shepherds trying to get a white calf accepted by his mother, which rejected him after a difficult birth.

Military use 
The Indian Army uses these camels to patrol in Ladakh. It was concluded that after carrying out trials and doing a comparative study with a single-humped camel brought from Rajasthan that the double-humped camel is better suited for the task at hand. Colonel Manoj Batra, a veterinary officer of the Indian Army, stated that the double-humped camel "are best suited for these conditions. They can survive without water for at least 72 hours."

Gallery

Footnotes

See also 
Bactria
Camel
List of animals with humps

References

External links 

 
 
 
 
  – BBC announces discovery of camels in the Gashun Gobi region

Camels
Mammals of China
Desert fauna
Mammals of India
Mammals of Central Asia
Mammals of Pakistan
Mammals of Mongolia
Livestock
EDGE species
Pack animals
Bactria
Mammals described in 1758
Taxa named by Carl Linnaeus